The 2019–20 Liga MX Femenil season was the third season of the top-flight women's football league in Mexico. The season was contested by nineteen teams the first semester and 18 the second, and all were the women's counterpart teams of the Liga MX. The season was split into two championships: the Torneo Apertura and the Torneo Clausura, each in an identical format and each contested by the same teams, unlike the two previous editions. Monterrey was crowned champion of the Apertura. However, due to league's suspension as a result of the COVID-19 pandemic, no team was selected as champion of the Clausura.

Teams, stadiums, and personnel
After the addition of Atlético San Luis and FC Juárez, the latter formerly Lobos BUAP Femenil, 19 teams participated in the Apertura. Veracruz did not participate in the Clausura, reducing both the men's and women's leagues back to 18 teams.

Stadiums and locations

Alternate venues
 América – Cancha Centenario No. 5
 Atlas – Estadio Colomos Alfredo 'Pistache' Torres (Capacity: 3,000)
 Guadalajara – Verde Valle
 Monterrey – El Barrial (Capacity: 570)
 UANL – Instalaciones Zuazua (Capacity: 800)

Personnel and kits

Format
The Liga MX Femenil season is split into two championships: the Torneo Apertura (opening tournament) and the Torneo Clausura (closing tournament). Each is contested in an identical format and includes the same nineteen teams.

Since 2019–20 season the teams compete in a single group, the best eight of the general table are classified to the championship playoffs.

Changes
With the addition of Atlético San Luis, this season consisted of nineteen teams.
Lobos BUAP were bought by FC Juárez, Juárez acquired all the BUAP's obligations including have a women's team.
This season will consist of 19 rounds (up from 17).
One team will rest each round.
During the previous 2 seasons, teams played against the other teams within the same group. This year, the group format was eliminated.

Mid-season changes 
 Veracruz did not participate in the Clausura 2020 due to the disaffiliation of the men's team.

Torneo Apertura
The Apertura 2019 season began on 12 July 2019 ended in December 2019.

Regular season

Standings

Positions by Round

Results
Teams play every other team once (either at home or away), with one team resting each round, completing a total of 19 rounds.

Regular Season statistics

Top goalscorers 
Players sorted first by goals scored, then by last name.

Source: Liga MX Femenil

Hat-tricks 

(H) – Home ; (A) – Away

Attendance

Per team

Highest and lowest

Source: Liga MX Femenil

Liguilla 
The eight best teams play two games against each other on a home-and-away basis. The higher seeded teams play on their home field during the second leg. The winner of each match up is determined by aggregate score. In the quarterfinals and semifinals, if the two teams are tied on aggregate and on away goals, the higher seeded team advances. In the final, if the two teams are tied after both legs, the match goes to extra time and, if necessary, a penalty shoot-out.

Quarter-finals
The first legs were played on 14 and 15 November, and the second legs were played on 17 and 18 November 2019.

|}

All times are UTC−6 except for matches in Tijuana.

First leg

Second leg

Semi-finals
The first legs were played on 21 and 22 November, and the second legs were played on 24 and 25 November 2019.

|}

First leg

Second leg

Final
The first leg was played on November 29, 2019, and the second leg was played on December 7, 2019.

|}

First leg

Second leg

Torneo Clausura
The Clausura 2020 season began on 4 January 2020. This tournament was played with only 18 teams due to the disaffiliation of Veracruz.

On 15 March 2020, the Mexican Football Federation suspended the Clausura seasons of Liga MX, Ascenso MX and Liga MX Femenil indefinitely due to the coronavirus pandemic.

On 22 May 2020 the season was cancelled due to the COVID-19 pandemic. No champion was crowned.

Standings

Positions by Round

Results 
Teams play every other team once (either at home or away), completing a total of 17 rounds.

Regular Season statistics

Top goalscorers 
Players sorted first by goals scored, then by last name.

Source: Liga MX Femenil

Hat-tricks 

(H) – Home ; (A) – Away

Attendance

Per team

Highest and lowest

Source: Liga MX Femenil

Liguilla 
The eight best teams play two games against each other on a home-and-away basis. The higher seeded teams play on their home field during the second leg. The winner of each match up is determined by aggregate score. In the quarterfinals and semifinals, if the two teams are tied on aggregate and on away goals, the higher seeded team advances. In the final, if the two teams are tied after both legs, the match goes to extra time and, if necessary, a penalty shoot-out.

See also 
2019–20 Liga MX season
2019–20 Ascenso MX season

References

External links
 Official website of Liga MX

Liga MX Femenil
Mexico
2019-20 in Mexican football
Association football events curtailed due to the COVID-19 pandemic